China National Highway 222 runs from Harbin to Yichun in Heilongjiang. It is 363 kilometres in length and runs northwest from Harbin. The entire highway lies within Heilongjiang Province.

Route and distance

See also
 China National Highways

Transport in Harbin
222